Cheraghabad-e Markazi (also Romanized as Cherāghābād-e Markazī) is a village in Cheraghabad Rural District, Tukahur District, Minab County, Hormozgan Province, Iran. At the 2006 census, its population was 898, in 176 families.

References 

Populated places in Minab County